Andreas Clauß (born 13 January 1969) is a German football coach and former player who played as a goalkeeper. He was a squad member for the 1987 FIFA World Youth Championship.

References

1969 births
Living people
German footballers
SV Waldhof Mannheim players
Kickers Offenbach players
SV Darmstadt 98 players
1. FC Kaiserslautern II players
Association football goalkeepers
Germany youth international footballers
Bundesliga players
2. Bundesliga players
German football managers
SV Waldhof Mannheim managers
Footballers from Mannheim